The Vibo A688 is a touchscreen smartphone released for the Vibo Telecom network on 18 January 2010. It runs the Google Android software, and is manufactured by Foxconn.

Specifications 
The specifications according to the Vibo website in October 2010:

Hardware 
Screen size: 3.2 in.
Screen resolution: HVGA (320 x 480 pixels)
Weight: 114.4g
Size: 56.8 x 114.9 x 12.6 mm
Input devices: touchscreen
Battery: 1230 mAh Li-ion
Talk time: 180 min
Standby time: up to 250 hrs
Processor: 600 MHz
RAM: 256 MB
ROM: 512 MB
Memory: up to 32 GB microSD
Wi-Fi, 802.11b/g
Bluetooth 2.0
GPS/AGPS receiver
Accelerometer
Proximity sensor
Digitcal compass
5 megapixels camera

Applications
Users may customize their phones by installing apps through the Android Market. Preinstalled applications are:
 800 radio telephone
 Android Market
 Games
 Google Talk
 Google Maps
 Google Calendar
 Gmail
 MuchMarts digital market
  digital market
 YouTube
 Widgets: Weather, stock prices, RSS

Clones
Vibo A688 was sold in various countries under several different names: Apanda A60, Chinavision Excalibur, Cincinnati Bell Blaze, Commtiva Z71, Gigabyte Gsmart G1305, Motorola Quench XT5 (XT502), Muchtel A1, Nexian Journey, Optimus Boston, Orange Boston, Spice Mi-300, Cherry Mobile Nova and Wellcom A88.

See also
 Galaxy Nexus
 List of Android devices

References

Smartphones
Android (operating system) devices
Mobile phones introduced in 2010
Foxconn